Taine Basham (born 2 November 1999) is a Welsh rugby union player who plays for Dragons as a flanker, and for the Welsh national side.

Club career

Basham started out at junior level with Talywain and has been developed in the Dragons Academy. Having played for both Bedwas RFC and Cross Keys RFC in the Premiership, Basham made his debut against Scarlets in January 2018 and went on to make nine appearances in the 2018/19 season. This concluded with Basham being named the Young Player of the Season at the region’s end-of-season awards.

Basham would score his first Dragons try in the defeat to Connacht in November 2018.

Basham began the 2019/20 season in outstanding form, scoring tries in each of his first three starts of the season. This was followed by a first career hattrick in the Challenge Cup victory over Castres. Basham would end the season having scored 9 tries in 20 games.

On 9 October 2021, Basham was named man of the match in the Dragons 35–22 victory over Connacht, their first win at the Sportsground since 2004.

International
Basham was capped as a Wales under-20 international. He was selected in the senior Wales squad to face the Barbarians in the uncapped international on 30 November 2019. On 5 February 2020 he was called up to the Wales 2020 Six Nations squad, though he did not receive a cap. Basham had to wait until June 2021 to receive his third call to the Wales squad for the tests against Canada and Argentina. Basham made his Wales debut as a replacement in the 68-12 win over Canada, crossing for two debut tries.

During the 2021 Autumn internationals Basham started all four matches for Wales, and was named as man of the match in the final test, a 29–28 win over Australia.

Basham scored his third try for Wales against Ireland in the opening match of the 2022 Six Nations Championship, a game that Wales lost 29-7. After starting the following two matches against Scotland and England, Basham was dropped from the team for the final two matches of the tournament.

Basham was part of the squad for the 2022 Wales rugby union tour of South Africa, and came off the bench in the third test.

After suffering a dislocated elbow while playing for the Dragons, Basham was ruled out of the 2022 end-of-year rugby union internationals.

International tries

References

External links 
Dragons profile
WRU profile

Welsh rugby union players
Dragons RFC players
Living people
Rugby union players from Newport, Wales
1999 births
Rugby union flankers
Wales international rugby union players